The Djalakuru were an indigenous Australian people of the Northern Territory.

Country
Little is known of the Djalakuru, and the extent of their land is inferred as the residue of what is unaccounted for when one has mapped the other historic tribal territories.

People
The only account we have of the Djalakuru comes from an overview of the Cobourg Peninsula written by George Windsor Earl in 1846.

Alternative name
 Jalakuru.

Notes

Citations

Sources

Aboriginal peoples of the Northern Territory